Sacerdotalis may refer to:

Crassispira sacerdotalis, a species of small predatory sea snail, a marine gastropod mollusk in the family Turridae, the turrids
Ordinatio sacerdotalis (Latin for "priestly ordination"), a Roman Catholic document discussing the Roman Catholic Church's position requiring the reservation of priestly ordination to men alone
Sacerdotalis caelibatus (Latin for "priestly celibacy"), the name of an encyclical written by Pope Paul VI on  the Catholic Church's tradition of priestly celibacy in the West
Fraternitas Sacerdotalis Sancti Pii X, the Latin name of the Society of Saint Pius X
Societas Sacerdotalis Sancti Pii Quinti, the Latin name of the Society of Saint Pius V